The 10th IAAF World Half Marathon Championships was held on 7 October 2001 in the city of Bristol, UK, and was run immediately before that year's Bristol Half Marathon. A total of 200 athletes, 125 men and 75 women, from 52 countries took part.
Detailed reports on the event and an appraisal of the results were given.

Complete results were published for men, for women, for men's team, and for women's team.

Medallists

Race results

Men's

Women's

Team results

Men's

Women's

Participation
The participation of 200 athletes (125 men/75 women) from 52 countries is reported.

 (5)
 (4)
 (2)
 (2)
 (6)
 (7)
 (1)
 (3)
 (9)
 (3)
 (1)
 (3)
 (2)
 (2)
 (1)
 (8)
 (1)
 (5)
 (4)
 (2)
 (9)
 (9)
 (2)
 (10)
 (2)
 (1)
 (1)
 (1)
 (1)
 (2)
 (5)
 (6)
 (1)
 (3)
 (1)
 (5)
 (5)
 (1)
 (1)
 (10)
 (5)
 (1)
 (1)
 (7)
 (4)
 (3)
 (10)
 (10)
 (6)
 (1)
 (4)
 (1)

See also
2001 in athletics (track and field)

References

External links
Official website

IAAF World Half Marathon Championships
Half Marathon Championships
World Athletics Half Marathon Championships
Sports competitions in Bristol
International athletics competitions hosted by England
2000s in Bristol